Hubba bint Hulail, was the grandmother of Hashim ibn 'Abd Manaf, thus the great-great-great-grandmother of the Islamic prophet Muhammad.

Biography
Hubbah was the daughter of Hulail ibn Hubshiyyah ibn Salul ibn Ka’b ibn Amr al-Khuza’i of Banu Khuza'a who was the trustee and guardian of the Ka‘bah ('Cube'). She married Qusai ibn Kilab and after her father died, the keys of the Kaaba were committed to her. Qusai, according to Hulail's will, had the trusteeship of the Kaaba after him.

Hubbah never gave up ambitious hopes for the line of her favourite son Abd Manaf. Her two favourite grandsons were the twin sons Amr and Abd Shams, of ‘Ātikah bint Murrah. Hubbah hoped that the opportunities missed by Abd Manaf would be made up for in these grandsons, especially Amr, who seemed much more suitable for the role than any of the sons of Abd al-Dar. He was dear to the ‘ayn (eye) of his grandmother Hubbah.

Family
Qusai ibn Kilab had four sons by Hubbah: Abd-al-Dar ibn Qusai dedicated to his house, Abdu’l Qusayy dedicated to himself, Abd-al-Uzza ibn Qusai to his goddess (Al-‘Uzzá) and Abd Manaf ibn Qusai to the idol revered by Hubbah. They also had two daughters, Takhmur and Barrah. Abd Manaf's real name was 'Mughirah', and he also had the nickname 'al-Qamar' (the Moon) because he was handsome.

Hubbah was related to Muhammad in more than one way. Firstly, she was the great-great-grandmother of his father Abdullah. She was also the great-grandmother of Umm Habib and Abdul-Uzza, respectively the maternal grandmother and grandfather of Muhammad's mother Aminah.

Family tree

 * indicates that the marriage order is disputed
 Note that direct lineage is marked in bold.

See also
Family tree of Muhammad
List of notable Hijazis

References

Year of death unknown
Year of birth unknown
5th-century women
5th-century Arabs
Family of Muhammad
Sahabah ancestors